The following article is a summary of the 2020–21 football season in France, which was the 87th season of competitive football in the country and ran from July 2020 to June 2021.

National teams

France national football team

Friendlies

UEFA Nations League A

Group 3

2022 FIFA World Cup qualification

Group D

UEFA Euro 2020

Group F

Knockout phase

France national under-21 football team

Summer Olympics 

Due to the COVID-19 pandemic, the games have been postponed to the summer of 2021. However, their official name remains 2020 Summer Olympics with the rescheduled 2021 dates have yet to be announced.

Group A

France women's national football team

Friendly matches

UEFA Women's Euro 2022 qualifying

Group G

2023 FIFA Women's World Cup qualification

Group B

UEFA competitions

UEFA Champions League

Group stage

Group C

Group E

Group H

Knockout phase

Round of 16 

|}

Quarter-finals

|}

Semi-finals

|}

UEFA Europa League

UEFA Europa League qualifying phase and play-off round

Second qualifying round

|}

Third qualifying round

|}

Group stage

Group C

Group H

Knockout phase

Round of 32

|}

UEFA Youth League

On 17 February 2021, the UEFA Executive Committee cancelled the tournament.

UEFA Champions League Path

|}

Domestic Champions Path

|}

UEFA Women's Champions League

Knockout phase

Round of 32

|}

Round of 16

|}

Notes

Quarter-finals

|}

Semi-finals

|}

League tables

Men

Ligue 1

Ligue 2 

• Promoted In Ligue 1:
Lorient
RC Lens

• Promoted In Ligue 2:
Pau FC
USL Dunkerque

Championnat National

Promoted In Clubs:
SC Bastia,
FC Sète 34,
Annecy FC,
Stade Briochin

Relegation In Championnat National 2:
Le Puy Foot 43 Auvergne,
AS Béziers,
Gazélec Ajaccio,
Sporting Toulon Var

Promoted In Ligue 2:
Pau FC,
USL Dunkerque

Relegation In Ligue 2:
Le Mans FC,
Orléans

Women

Division 1 Féminine

Cup competitions

2020–21 Coupe de France

Final

2020 Trophée des Champions

2020–21 Coupe de France Féminine

Notes

References

 
Seasons in French football
French
French